USS Cape Esperance (CVE-88) was a  of the United States Navy. She was named after the Battle of Cape Esperance, an inconclusive naval engagement in support of the Guadalcanal campaign. Built for service during World War II, the ship was launched in March 1944, and commissioned in April, and served as a replenishment carrier. Postwar, she participated in Operation Magic Carpet. She was decommissioned in August 1946, when she was mothballed in the Pacific Reserve Fleet. However, she was recommissioned in August 1950, and assigned to become an auxiliary vessel as a part of Military Sealift Command. She was decommissioned again in January 1959, and ultimately, she was sold for scrapping in May 1959.

Design and description

Cape Esperance was a Casablanca-class escort carrier, the most numerous type of aircraft carriers ever built, and designed specifically to be mass-produced using prefabricated sections, in order to replace heavy war losses sustained in the early engagements of the Pacific War. She displaced  standard,  with a full load. She was powered with two Skinner Unaflow reciprocating steam engines, which drove two shafts, providing , thus enabling her to make . Her compact size necessitated the installment of an aircraft catapult at her bow, and there were two aircraft elevators to facilitate movement of aircraft between the flight and hangar deck: one each fore and aft.

One /38 caliber dual-purpose gun was mounted on the stern. Anti-aircraft defense was provided by 8 Bofors  anti-aircraft guns in single mounts, as well as 12 Oerlikon  cannons, which were mounted around the perimeter of the deck. By the end of the war, Casablanca-class carriers had been modified to carry thirty 20-mm cannons, and the amount of 40-mm guns had been doubled to sixteen, by putting them into twin mounts. These modifications were in response to increasing casualties due to kamikaze attacks. Casablanca-class escort carriers were designed to carry 27 aircraft, but the hangar deck could accommodate more. Due to Cape Esperance serving as a replenishment of transport carrier throughout most of her time in service, it frequently carried up to sixty aircraft during these missions, around the maximum amount at which the flight deck would still be functional. She was designed to accommodate 764 crew, but in wartime, her complement inevitably crept over that number. A reasonable estimate puts the number of crew typically on board a Casablanca-class escort carrier at around 910 to 916 men.

Construction
Her construction was awarded to Kaiser Shipbuilding Company, Vancouver, Washington under a Maritime Commission contract, on 18 June 1942, under the name Tananek Bay (a misspelling of "Tonowek Bay"), as part of a tradition which named escort carriers after bays or sounds in Alaska. The escort carrier was laid down on 11 December 1943, MC hull 1125, the thirty-fourth of a series of fifty Casablanca-class escort carriers. She therefore received the classification symbol CVE-88. On 6 November 1943, she was renamed Cape Esperance, as part of a new naval policy which named subsequent Casablanca-class carriers after naval or land engagements. She was named after the Battle of Cape Esperance, an early and inconclusive naval battle fought in support of the Guadalcanal campaign. She was launched on 3 March 1944; sponsored by Mrs. W. M. McDade; transferred to the United States Navy and commissioned on 9 April 1944.

Service history

World War II

Upon being commissioned, Cape Esperance underwent a shakedown cruise down the West Coast to San Diego. She then underwent two transport missions, ferrying new aircraft to bases in the South and West Pacific, and returning to the West Coast with damaged aircraft. After returning from her second transport run, she was assigned to Task Group 30.8, the replenishment escort carrier group. She was loaded with replacement aircraft at San Francisco, and departed on 5 October 1944. She rendezvoused with the other replenishment carriers on 2 November, and provided replacement aircraft to the Fast Carrier Task Force operating against Japanese positions on Leyte and Luzon. The replenishment carriers would meet with the frontline carriers at designated rendezvous days, during which supplies and aircraft would be transferred. She was based from and received additional replacement aircraft at Ulithi and Guam.

The Third Fleet had been operating against positions on Luzon since 14 December, but its escorting destroyers ran low on fuel. As a result, the fleet retired to the east to refuel, and to receive replacement aircraft from Task Group 30.8. Cape Esperance was carrying thirty-nine planes on her flight deck, along with another twelve stored in her hangar deck. The location had been chosen because it lay out of range of Japanese fighters, but it also happened to lie within Typhoon Alley, where many Pacific tropical cyclones transited. As the escort carriers and the Third Fleet met, Typhoon Cobra began to bear down. At 01:00 in the night, fueling operations were attempted with the destroyers, although heavy winds and listing seas complicated the matter. At the same time, barometers on-board the ships began to drop, and tropical storm force winds were recorded.

As the weather continued to deteriorate, Admiral William Halsey Jr. ordered fueling operations suspended at 13:10, just after noon. Two hours later, he instead ordered his fleet to proceed due southwards,  from where the fleet was located. This brought the fleet directly into the typhoon's core. To make matters worse for the Third Fleet, Halsey ordered the fleet to proceed northwards at 22:20, putting the fleet in the quadrant of the typhoon with the highest winds. Attached to the Third Fleet, Cape Esperance followed, although Captain Bockius had begun preparations on 17 December. The aircraft on the flight deck had been tied down, weight had been transferred downwards to lower the ship's center of gravity, the hatches had been battened down, and the crew had been informed to stay on the port side of the carrier to counteract any list in the ship. The ship's aircraft elevators had also been lowered, in the hopes that this transferred weight would negate the lists generated from the wind.

At 07:00, on the morning of 18 December, the fleet was inescapably trapped in the typhoon's path. Conflicting orders meant that some of the destroyers attempted to do some fueling during the morning, even as waves with an estimated height of  pounded the task force. At 09:52, Cape Esperance began maneuvering independently of the task force. Multiple rolls of 36° were recorded, and the occasional roll of 39° frightened the ship's command. The ship's officers began discussing the possibility of jettisoning the aircraft on the flight deck to make the ship less top-heavy, before discarding the idea. The typhoon's winds solved the weight problem, by ripping the aircraft on the flight deck from their restraints, and carrying them into the ocean. However, at 12:28, an aircraft ended up stuck on the forward starboard stack, and caught on fire, forcing an evacuation of the bridge. Fortunately for the crew, as the carrier rocked and yawed, the plane was dislodged and carried overboard. The fire sparked by the aircraft, which had threatened to become a conflagration because of the aircraft's fuel tanks, ended up being extinguished by the rain.

The loss of most of the planes on the flight deck meant that Cape Esperance no longer threatened to keel over. At 16:00, another plane on the flight deck broke loose, and plummeted through the open forward aircraft elevator, landing on another plane. Fortunately for the crew, a fire did not result from this collision. As the carrier emerged from the typhoon, of the thirty-nine aircraft fastened to the flight deck, only seven remained. Although all of the planes in the hangar deck survived, eight planes were struck due to damage. As a result, she only had eleven replacement planes which she could deliver to the battered Third Fleet. Although 790 crewmen perished in the typhoon, none were from Cape Esperance. Her flight deck, damaged by the blaze, required major repairs.

She continued her duties as a replenishment carrier through the New Year, although repairs were made at bases in Guam and Ulithi. She retired from the replenishment carrier fleet in February 1945, heading back to the West Coast. There, she loaded aircraft, which she ferried to Guam. Until news of the surrender of Japan broke, she acted as a transport carrier, transporting newly minted aircraft from the United States to the West Pacific, in order to replace heavy war losses over Okinawa and the Japanese home islands. Whilst she was transporting aircraft, Captain Patrick Henry, Jr. took over command of the vessel on 3 May.

Post-war and Cold War

Following the end of the war, she joined the Operation Magic Carpet fleet, which repatriated U.S. servicemen from around the Pacific. She first made a run from San Diego to Pearl Harbor, ferrying aircraft and veterans to San Francisco, where she arrived on 11 September 1945. Until mid-1946, she made several such Magic Carpet runs, touching stops throughout the Pacific. After being released from the Magic Carpet fleet, she proceeded to Bremerton, Washington, where she was decommissioned on 22 August 1946, and subsequently mothballed in the Pacific Reserve Fleet.

Cape Esperance was recommissioned on 5 August 1950 under the identification T-CVE-88, as an aircraft transport carrier serving under the Military Sealift Command. Most of her weapons were stripped from her hull, and she was operated by a mostly civilian crew. Immediately after being recommissioned, she began delivering aircraft to Japan, where they would participant in the Korean War. For the next nine years, Cape Esperance fulfilled a variety of duties, including supporting nuclear tests at Eniwetok, and ferrying aircraft to the Royal Thai Air Force. She engaged in an average of nine transpacific voyages per year, reinforcing forces of the Southeast Asia Treaty Organization, as well as U.S. assets in the Pacific. In 1952, she steamed for Hong Kong, where she evacuated planes of the Republic of China Air Force which were in danger of being seized by advancing PLA forces. She was reclassified as a utility aircraft transport carrier, T-CVU-88, on 12 June 1955, and began conducting transatlantic voyages, ferrying aircraft to bases in Western Europe. She then returned to the Pacific, and proceeded to transport aircraft to Pakistan in 1956.

She was decommissioned a second time on 15 January 1959, as the operation of Casablanca-class escort carriers became less and less economical. She was abandoned in favor of s, who served for another decade as transport carriers, before they too became obsolete and uneconomical. She was sold for scrapping on 14 May 1959, and ultimately broken up in Japan throughout January 1961.

References

Sources

Online sources

Bibliography

External links 

 

 

Casablanca-class escort carriers
World War II escort aircraft carriers of the United States
Korean War auxiliary ships of the United States
Cold War auxiliary ships of the United States
Ships built in Vancouver, Washington
1944 ships
S4-S2-BB3 ships